Lotería is a Panama Metro station on Line 1. The station was not in the original metro plans and was the twelfth station to be opened. The official opening was carried out by President of Panama Juan Carlos Varela on 27 August 2014, four months after the network had opened. The station was originally to be called Marañón after a nearby district, but, in February 2012, was renamed to reflect its proximity to the offices of Panama's national lottery.

In its first year of operations, Lotería was the ninth most used station of the twelve on the network at that time, used by 8% of the network's passengers.

References

Panama Metro stations
2014 establishments in Panama
Railway stations opened in 2014